Gustav A. Knauer (1886–1950) was a German art director. He designed the sets of more than a hundred films during his career.

Selected filmography
 The White Roses of Ravensberg (1919)
 The Flight into Marriage (1922)
 Alone in the Jungle (1922)
 Felicitas Grolandin (1923)
 The Brigantine of New York (1924)
 Darling of the King (1924)
 The Dealer from Amsterdam (1925)
 Old Mamsell's Secret (1925)
 Goetz von Berlichingen of the Iron Hand (1925)
 The Mill at Sanssouci (1926)
 Letters Which Never Reached Him (1925)
 The Bank Crash of Unter den Linden (1926)
 The Bohemian Dancer (1926)
 Light Cavalry (1927)
 Assassination (1927)
 Radio Magic (1927)
 A Murderous Girl (1927)
 Linden Lady on the Rhine (1927)
 Forbidden Love (1927)
 Don Juan in a Girls' School (1928)
 The Lady from Argentina (1928)
 Love in the Cowshed (1928)
 Only a Viennese Woman Kisses Like That (1928)
 The Green Alley (1928)
 A Mother's Love (1929)
 From a Bachelor's Diary (1929)
 Beware of Loose Women (1929)
 The Lord of the Tax Office  (1929)
 The Customs Judge (1929)
 Secret Police (1929)
 German Wine (1929)
 The Woman Everyone Loves Is You (1929)
 The Daredevil Reporter (1929)
 The Youths (1929)
 Distinguishing Features (1929)
 The Night of Terror (1929)
 Youthful Indiscretion (1929)
 Yes, Yes, Women Are My Weakness (1929)
 Witnesses Wanted (1930)
 Rag Ball (1930)
 The Love Market (1930)
 Busy Girls (1930)
 Of Life and Death (1930)
 Next, Please! (1930)
 The Man in the Dark (1930)
 Bobby Gets Going (1931)
 Secret of the Blue Room (1932)
 Rasputin, Demon with Women (1932)
 Secret Agent (1932)
 Life Begins Tomorrow (1933)
 The Gentleman from Maxim's (1933)
 What Am I Without You (1934)
 The Flower Girl from the Grand Hotel (1934)
 The Brenken Case (1934)
 Susanne in the Bath (1936)
 The Mysterious Mister X (1936)
 Stjenka Rasin (1936)
 The Barber of Seville (1938)
 Women for Golden Hill (1938)
 Wild Bird (1943)
 The Master Detective (1944)
 The Appeal to Conscience (1949)

References

Bibliography
 Gerd Gemünden. A Foreign Affair: Billy Wilder's American Films. Berghahn Books, 2008.

External links

1886 births
1950 deaths
German art directors
Film people from Berlin